Kampala Speke Hotel is a hotel in Kampala, the capital and largest city in Uganda, the third-largest economy in the East African Community.

Location
The hotel is located in the heart of Kampala, at 7-9 Nile Avenue, on Nakasero Hill, close to the Grand Imperial Hotel and the Kampala Sheraton Hotel. This location is close to banks, shopping arcades and offices, in the middle of Kampala's central business district. The coordinates of Kampala Speke Hotel are:0°18'55.0"N, 32°34'58.0"E (Latitude:0.315278; Longitude:32.582778).

Overview
Speke Hotel is named after John Hanning Speke, the first European to lay his eyes on the  Source of the Nile. It is one of the oldest hotels in Uganda, built in the 1920s. Over the years, despite numerous renovations and upgrades, Speke Hotel has retained its colonial ambiance. The hotel has fifty en-suite rooms, several themed restaurants (including Italian and Indian) and a cocktail bar.

Ownership
The hotel is a member of the Ruparelia Group, which includes four other hotels in Kampala. As of July 2014, the hotels of the Ruparelia Group include:
 Speke Resort and Conference Center - Munyonyo, Kampala
 Munyonyo Commonwealth Resort - Munyonyo, Kampala
 Kampala Speke Hotel - Kampala
 Kabira Country Club - Bukoto, Kampala
 Forest Cottages - Kampala
 Bukoto Heights Apparments- Kampala
 Dolphin Suites - Kampala

See also

References

External links
 Kampala Speke Hotel Homepage
 Profile at Hotelsinuganda.com

Hotels in Kampala
Kampala Central Division
Hotels established in 1925
Ruparelia Group